Gephyra is a genus of snout moths. It was described by Francis Walker in 1859.

Species
 Gephyra cynisca (Druce, 1895)
 Gephyra getusalis Walker, 1859
 Gephyra pusilla (C. Felder, R. Felder & Rogenhofer, 1875)
 Gephyra saturatalis (Walker, 1859)

References

Chrysauginae
Pyralidae genera